Alan Hydes (born 1947 in Barnsley) is a male former international table tennis player from England.

Table tennis career
He represented England at three World Table Tennis Championships in the Swaythling Cup (men's team event) from 1969-1973.

He won five English National Table Tennis Championships titles and represented Yorkshire at county level and Barnsley.

See also
 List of England players at the World Team Table Tennis Championships

References

Sportspeople from Barnsley
English male table tennis players
1947 births
Living people